Each year the Alabama Miss Basketball award is given to the person chosen as the best high school girls basketball player in the U.S. state of Alabama.  The award winner is selected by members of the Alabama Sports Writers Association.

Award winners

See also
Alabama Mr. Basketball

References

Mr. and Miss Basketball awards
Basketball in Alabama
Women's sports in Alabama
Lists of people from Alabama
Lists of American sportswomen
American women's basketball players
Miss Basketball